The 2018 Copa CONMEBOL Libertadores Femenina de Futsal was the 5th edition of the Copa Libertadores Femenina de Futsal, South America's premier women's club futsal tournament organized by CONMEBOL.

The tournament was held at Luque, Paraguay between 7–14 October 2018.

Leões Da Serra defeated Sport Colonial in the final to win their first title. San Lorenzo defeated Lyon to finish third. Unochapecó were the defending champions, but did not qualify for this edition.

Teams
The competition is contested by 10 teams: one entry from each of the ten CONMEBOL associations.

Venues
The tournament was played at the Polideportivo del Comité Olímpico Paraguayo in Luque.

Draw
The draw of the tournament was held on 13 September 2018, 11:00 PYT (UTC−4) at the headquarters of the Paraguayan Football Association in Asunción. The 10 teams were drawn into two groups of five. The following two teams were seeded:
Group A: representatives of the host association, Sport Colonial (Paraguay)
Group B: representatives of the association of the 2017 Copa Libertadores Femenina de Futsal champions, Leões Da Serra (Brazil)

The remaining teams were seeded based on the results of their association in the 2017 Copa Libertadores Femenina de Futsal.

Squads
Each team has to submit a squad of 14 players, including a minimum of two goalkeepers (Regulations Article 33).

Group stage
The top two teams of each group advance to the semi-finals. The teams are ranked according to points (3 points for a win, 1 point for a draw, 0 points for a loss). If tied on points, tiebreakers are applied in the following order (Regulations Article 21):
Results in head-to-head matches between tied teams (points, goal difference, goals scored);
Goal difference in all matches;
Goals scored in all matches;
Drawing of lots.

All times are local, PYST (UTC−3).

Group A

Group B

Knockout stage
In the semi-finals and final, extra time and penalty shoot-out are used to decide the winner if necessary (Regulations Article 22).

Bracket

Semi-finals

Third place match

Final

References

External links
CONMEBOL Libertadores de Futsal Femenino Paraguay 2018, CONMEBOL.com

2018
2018 in South American futsal
2018 in Paraguayan football
October 2018 sports events in South America
International futsal competitions hosted by Paraguay